IATO (Indutria Automobili TOscana) was an Italian car manufacturer which produced a single model from 1985 to 1993.

History 
IATO was founded in 1985 in Pontedera, Italy. The only car produced by the company was a small SUV created to compete with the Suzuki SJ.

The IATO was assembled in Nusco and featured FIAT mechanical parts, including the engine from a FIAT Croma; it was also built around a steel chassis with fiberglass body panels.

The company declared bankruptcy in 1993 after having only produced 182 SUVs.

References 

Italian companies established in 1985
Automotive companies established in 1985
Automotive companies of Italy